Tanisha C. Ford (born ) is an American scholar, historian, and author. She is professor in the History Department at the Graduate Center at The City University of New York. Ford is an expert on black historical fashion and culture. She was named of the 100 most influential African Americans by The Root. She additionally writes for The Atlantic, and contributed to The New York Times, The Root, Elle.com, and Aperture.

Career 
Her book Liberated Threads: Black Women, Style, and the Global Politics of Soul won the 2016 Liberty Legacy Foundation Award for Best Book on Civil Rights History from the Organization of American Historians.

Selected works

References 

American women writers
American women historians
Graduate Center, CUNY faculty
1980s births
Living people
21st-century American women